Charles E. Hallstrom (January 22, 1863 – May 6, 1949), nicknamed the "Swedish Wonder", was a Swedish Major League Baseball player who pitched one game for the  Providence Grays of the National League. The Grays were in need of a pitcher for that day's game versus the Chicago White Stockings, and used Hallstrom, a local Chicago amateur player.  Hallstrom is the first of four Major League Baseball players born in Sweden. He was born in Jönköping, Sweden, and died in Chicago at the age of 86. He is interred at the All Saints Cemetery in Des Plaines, Illinois.

References
General
Snyder, John. 2005. Cubs journal: year by year & day by day with the Chicago Cubs since 1876. Emmis Books. .
Specific

External links

1864 births
1949 deaths
19th-century baseball players
Major League Baseball pitchers
Major League Baseball players from Sweden
Providence Grays players
Swedish emigrants to the United States
Oshkosh (minor league baseball) players
LaCrosse Freezers players
Lima Lushers players
Minneapolis Millers (baseball) players
Chicago Whitings players